Rachid Trenidad (born 6 July 1994) is a Bonaire footballer who currently plays for USV Elinkwijk of the Dutch Hoofdklasse, and the Bonaire national football team.

Club career
Trenidad began playing for SV Vespo of the Bonaire League in at least 2014. He captained a team in the Après-Ski Tournament hosted by USV Elinkwijk in the Netherlands in 2018. Fellow-Bonaire international Guillermo Montero was on the club's senior roster at the time.

International career
Trenidad made his senior international debut on 1 June 2014 in a 2–1 victory over the U.S. Virgin Islands.

International statistics

References

External links
Caribbean Football Database profile
National Football Teams profile

Living people
Association football defenders
Bonaire international footballers
1994 births
Bonaire footballers